Heliconia stricta is a plant species native to Brazil, Colombia, Venezuela, Ecuador, Peru, Bolivia, Guyana, Suriname, reproducing by seeds and by underground rhizomes. It is reportedly naturalized in Cuba and Puerto Rico, and cultivated as an ornamental in many other warm regions. The young leaves and bracts retain water, forming pools called phytotelmata, which provide habitat for diverse invertebrates.

Some common cultivated varieties are:

Bucky
Dwarf Jamaican
Fire Bird
Iris Bannochie
Oliveira's Sharonii
Tagami

References

External links
 Heliconia stricta observations on iNaturalist

stricta
Garden plants
Plants described in 1906
Flora of Colombia
Flora of Puerto Rico
Flora of Cuba
Flora of Suriname
Flora of Guyana
Flora of Bolivia
Flora of Peru
Flora of Ecuador
Flora of Venezuela
Flora of Brazil
Flora without expected TNC conservation status